The World University Handball Championship is the World University Championship (WUC) in handball competition contested by the men's and women's university's national teams of the member federations/associations of International University Sports Federation (FISU).

The men's tournament which was established in 1963 is the oldest World University Championship in 1994 there was established a women's tournament. Since 2006 both the men's and women's tournaments are held at the same place every two years.

Men's tournament

Summary

Medal table

Participating nations

Women's tournament

Summary

Medal table

Participating nations

References

External links
Official website

 

 
Recurring sporting events established in 1963
University
Handball